Rolv Thesen (14 July 1896 – 13 September 1966) was a Norwegian poet, literary researcher and literary critic.

He was born in Moskenes. Among his works is a three-volume biography on Arne Garborg, of which the first volume contained his doctoral thesis. He also wrote a biography on Olav Duun, and the monography Diktaren og bygda. He was literary critic for the newspaper Arbeiderbladet from 1928. He was member of the literary council of the Norwegian Authors' Union from 1937 to 1963, and served as board member of Det Norske Teatret from 1940 to 1949.

References

1896 births
1966 deaths
People from Moskenes
20th-century Norwegian poets
Norwegian male poets
Norwegian biographers
Male biographers
Norwegian literary critics
20th-century Norwegian male writers